Aladdin and his Winter Wish is an American panto version of the Middle Eastern folk tale Aladdin. The panto's book was written by Kris Lythgoe and its music is based around classic pop tunes by artists such as Ray Charles, Coldplay, and Starship. Aladdin and his Winter Wish premiered at the Pasadena Playhouse on December 11, 2013 and ran through December 29 of the same year.

Plot 
The story follows the general Aladdin pantomime. Wishee Washee is Aladdin’s brother and Widow Twankey is Aladdin’s mother.

Songs

Act 1 
Jai Ho - Ensemble
I'm Too Sexy - Widow Twankey
Break My Stride - Aladdin and Wishee
You Don’t Know Me - Aladdin
Old Time Rock’n’ Roll - Widow Twankey
What Makes You Beautiful
Call Me Maybe - Princess
Billionairre - Aladdin
Fantasy - Genie

Act 2 

Treasure - Aladdin
Viva La Vida - Abanazar
Nothing's Gonna Stop Us Now - Aladdin and Princess
Walking on Sunshine - Aladdin and Princess
Merry Christmas Everyone - Ensemble

Reception
Reception for Aladdin and his Winter Wish was positive. The Los Angeles Times gave it a positive review, stating that adults would be likely to enjoy it as much as their children would. Los Angeles magazine and LA Weekly also praised the work, with Los Angeles citing Ben Vereen's performance as a highlight.

References

Pantomime
Pasadena, California
2013 plays